The Shenkeng Light Rail is a planned light rail transit (LRT) system in Shenkeng and Shiding Districts, New Taipei City, Taiwan. The route extends eastwards from Taipei City Zoo through Shenkeng District, terminating at National Freeway No 5's Shiding service area. The line links the Wenhu MRT line and Circular line, and is known in the New Taipei Metro system as the Sienna line, or line S.

See also
 Rail transport in Taiwan
 List of railway stations in Taiwan

References

Railway lines in Taiwan